The Early Beatles is the Beatles' sixth album released on Capitol Records, and their eighth album overall for the American market. All of the tracks on this album had previously been issued on the early 1964 Vee-Jay Records release Introducing... The Beatles. The front cover photo for this album features the same back cover photo for the British LP Beatles for Sale.

The album is included in Robert Christgau's "Basic Record Library" of 1950s and 1960s recordings, published in Christgau's Record Guide: Rock Albums of the Seventies (1981).

Background
Vee-Jay Records had gained American distribution rights to the tracks on this album before the group became popular in America (because Capitol Records, the US subsidiary of EMI which owned the Beatles' record label Parlophone, had declined to release the group's records in America), and their releases had initially failed to chart. But after the group became famous, Vee-Jay, still holding the rights to the early material, was able to reissue them in America and this time the records sold in the millions. Capitol filed a lawsuit attempting to stop Vee Jay from distributing the tracks, but was unsuccessful. In October 1964, Vee-Jay's license to distribute the Beatles recordings they possessed expired, thus giving Capitol the distribution rights for the tracks on the album.

Release and reception
Although Vee-Jay had compiled four albums, ten singles and one EP in the space of just fifteen months from these Beatles tracks, when issued by Capitol, The Early Beatles sold well, but its highest chart position was only number 43, making it the only original Beatles album issued by Capitol or United Artists Records not to reach numbers 1 or 2 in America (with the exception of the Capitol documentary album, The Beatles' Story, which peaked at number 7). Capitol did little to promote The Early Beatles since the label merely viewed it as a replacement for Introducing...The Beatles, rather than a "new" Beatles album. The Early Beatles was certified Gold ($1 million in sales) on 8 January 1974 and Platinum (1 million copies sold) on 10 January 1997 by the RIAA. The album was released in both mono and stereo versions. As no stereo masters of "Love Me Do" and "P.S. I Love You" exist, Capitol used EMI's duophonic mixes of both songs. The mono pressing of the album was made with a two-to-one fold-down of the stereo tapes, as evidenced by John and Paul's vocal collision and chuckle heard in the third verse of "Please Please Me".  The original mix on the UK mono issue of the Please Please Me album uses an edit to correct the mistake, while the stereo version of the same album does not. So the existence of the vocal error in a mono mix is unique to The Early Beatles as well as a short-lived Capitol Starline 45 rpm single released in October, 1965 and deleted only two months later.

Compact disc
The Early Beatles is available on compact disc as part of The Capitol Albums, Volume 2 boxed set (catalogue number CDP 0946 3 57498 2 3), in both its original stereo and mono fold-down Capitol mixes. A second CD version of The Early Beatles with the songs in both stereo and true mono was issued in 2014 individually and part of the Beatles The U.S. Albums boxed set.

Personnel
 John Lennon – rhythm guitar, acoustic guitar, harmonica, vocals
 Paul McCartney – bass guitar, vocals
 George Harrison – lead guitar, acoustic guitar, vocals
 Ringo Starr – drums, tambourine, maracas
 Andy White – drums on Love Me Do and P.S. I Love You 
 George Martin – celesta on Baby It's You

Track listing
The album consists of eleven of the fourteen tracks from the Beatles' first American album Introducing...The Beatles as well as their first British LP Please Please Me.  All songs written by Lennon-McCartney except where noted.

Side one
"Love Me Do" – 2:23
"Twist and Shout" (Phil Medley and Bert Russell) – 2:33
"Anna (Go to Him)" (Arthur Alexander) – 3:00
"Chains" (Gerry Goffin and Carole King) – 2:27
"Boys" (Luther Dixon and Wes Farrell) – 2:25
"Ask Me Why" – 2:28

Side two
"Please Please Me" – 2:00
"P.S. I Love You" – 2:05
"Baby It's You" (Burt Bacharach, Mack David, and Luther Dixon, credited as Barney Williams) – 2:38
"A Taste of Honey" (Ric Marlow and Bobby Scott) – 2:04
"Do You Want to Know a Secret" – 1:59

Remaining Vee-Jay tracks issued on LP by Capitol in the US

Charts and certifications

Chart performance

Certifications

Notes

References

 

Albums produced by George Martin
The Beatles compilation albums
1965 compilation albums
Capitol Records compilation albums